Adobha Subregion is a subregion in the Northern Red Sea region of Eritrea.

References
Adobha

Northern Red Sea Region
Subregions of Eritrea